A Country Hero is a 1917 American two-reel silent comedy film directed by and starring Roscoe "Fatty" Arbuckle and featuring Buster Keaton. The film is considered to be lost.

Cast
 Roscoe 'Fatty' Arbuckle as Village Blacksmith
 Buster Keaton as Vaudeville Artist
 Al St. John as City Gent
 Alice Lake as Schoolteacher
 Joe Keaton as Cy Klone, Garage Owner
 Scott Pembroke (as Stanley Pembroke)
 Natalie Talmadge as Bit Part (uncredited)

See also
 Fatty Arbuckle filmography
 Buster Keaton filmography
 List of lost films

References

External links

A Country Hero at SilentEra
 A Country Hero at the International Buster Keaton Society

1917 films
1917 lost films
1917 comedy films
1917 short films
American silent short films
American black-and-white films
Silent American comedy films
American comedy short films
Films directed by Roscoe Arbuckle
Films with screenplays by Roscoe Arbuckle
Lost comedy films
Lost American films
1910s American films